This is a list of Navy Midshipmen football players in the NFL draft.

Key

Selections

Notable undrafted players
Note: No drafts held before 1936

References

Navy

Navy Midshipmen NFL draft